Ryan A. Rote (born in West Palm Beach, Florida) is an American pitcher. He is currently retired. Rote pitched in 2004 and 2005 for Vanderbilt University before he was selected by Chicago White Sox in 5th  Round (155th overall) of 2005 Major League Baseball Draft with a signing bonus of $90,000.

Rote's career peaked towards the end of 2009 when he was called up to AAA Charlotte Knights, pitching in 3 games with a 1.93 ERA. He also pitched for Australia in an exhibition match against the White Sox.

Grandson of Hall of Fame quarterback Tobin Rote.

References

Baseball pitchers
Living people
Year of birth missing (living people)